Bioggio railway station is a railway station in the municipality of Bioggio in the Swiss canton of Ticino. The station is on the metre gauge Lugano–Ponte Tresa railway (FLP), between Lugano and Ponte Tresa.

The station is on a section of double track line, which stretches from just north of the station to Serocca station. It has two side platforms.

Services 
 the following services stop at Bioggio:

References

External links 
 
 

Bioggio
Ferrovie Luganesi stations